Due to its ancient history and the presence of St. Paul the Apostle in Corinth, several locations all over the world have been named after the city.

United States 
 Corinth, Bullock County, Alabama
 Corinth, Clay County, Alabama
 Corinth, Cullman County, Alabama
 Corinth, Randolph County, Alabama
 Corinth, Walker County, Alabama
 Corinth (Plantersville), Alabama
 Corinth, Bradley County, Arkansas
 Corinth, Howard County, Arkansas
 Corinth, Polk County, Arkansas
 Corinth, Yell County, Arkansas
 Corinth, Coweta and Heard Counties, Georgia
 Corinth, Sumter County, Georgia
 Corinth, Walker County, Georgia
 Corinth, Humboldt County, Iowa
 Corinth, Williamson County, Illinois
 Corinth, Osborne County, Kansas
 Corinth, Humboldt County, Iowa
 Corinth, Grant, Harrison, and Scott Counties, Kentucky
 Corinth, Logan County, Kentucky
 Corinth, Lincoln Parish, Louisiana
 Corinth, Penobscot County, Maine
 Corinth, Kent County, Michigan
 Corinth, Phelps County, Missouri
 Corinth, Alcorn County, Mississippi
 Corinth, Perry County, Mississippi
 Corinth, Big Horn County, Montana
 Corinth (town), New York
 Corinth (village), New York
 Corinth, Chatham County, North Carolina
 Corinth, Nash County, North Carolina
 Corinth, Rutherford County, North Carolina
 Corinth, Williams County, North Dakota
 Corinth, Oconee County, South Carolina
 Corinth, Saluda County, South Carolina
 Corinth, Texas
 Corinth, Vermont
 Corinth, West Virginia
 Corinth-Holder (Hocutts Crossroads), North Carolina

Brazil 
 Corinto, Minas Gerais

Colombia 
 Corinto, Cauca

El Salvador 
 Corinto, Morazán

Nicaragua 
 Corinto, Chinandega

Corinth
 
Corinth
Greece